Micromidia rodericki is a species of dragonfly in the family Austrocorduliidae,
known as the Thursday Island mosquitohawk. 
It is a very small, black to metallic green dragonfly with pale markings on its abdomen.
It is endemic to Thursday Island, Australia, in Torres Strait,
where it inhabits rainforest streams.

Gallery

Note
There is uncertainty about which family Micromidia rodericki best belongs to: Austrocorduliidae, Synthemistidae, or Corduliidae.

See also
 List of Odonata species of Australia

References

Austrocorduliidae
Odonata of Australia
Insects of Australia
Endemic fauna of Australia
Taxa named by Frederic Charles Fraser
Insects described in 1959